Epopostruma is a genus of ants in the subfamily Myrmicinae. It is restricted to Australia.

Species
Epopostruma alata Shattuck, 2000
Epopostruma angela Shattuck, 2000
Epopostruma angulata Shattuck, 2000
Epopostruma areosylva Shattuck, 2000
Epopostruma avicula Shattuck, 2000
Epopostruma curiosa Shattuck, 2000
Epopostruma frosti (Brown, 1948)
Epopostruma infuscocephala Shattuck, 2000
Epopostruma inornata Shattuck, 2007
Epopostruma kangarooensis Shattuck, 2000
Epopostruma lattini Shattuck, 2000
Epopostruma mercurii Shattuck, 2000
Epopostruma monstrosa Viehmeyer, 1925
Epopostruma natalae Shattuck, 2000
Epopostruma quadrispinosa (Forel, 1895)
Epopostruma sowestensis Shattuck, 2000
Epopostruma terrula Shattuck, 2000
Epopostruma vitta Shattuck, 2000
Epopostruma wardi Shattuck, 2000

References

External links

Myrmicinae
Ant genera
Hymenoptera of Australia